Gusti Syamsir Alam Airport , or commonly known as Stagen Airport, is an airport on Laut Island in Kotabaru Regency, South Kalimantan, Indonesia.

Airlines and destinations

References

Airports in South Kalimantan